The 1834 Maine gubernatorial election took place on September 8, 1834. Incumbent Democratic Governor Robert P. Dunlap defeated Whig candidate Peleg Sprague.

Results

Notes

References

Gubernatorial
1834
Maine
September 1834 events